The Zimbabwean Independence Trophy is a Zimbabwean association football knockout tournament. It was created as a clubs competition in 1983 played during commemorations of the country's independence. The final is usually played on 18 April, which is the nation's Independence Day.

Winners 
Previous winners are:
1983 : Dynamos (Harare)
1984 : Dynamos (Harare)
1985 : zonal match
1986 : Highlanders (Bulawayo)
1987 : Black Rhinos (Harare)
1988 : Highlanders (Bulawayo)
1989 : Zimbabwe Saints (Bulawayo)
1990 : Dynamos (Harare)
1991 : Highlanders (Bulawayo)
1992 : CAPS United (Harare)
1993 : CAPS United (Harare)
1994 : Chapungu United (Gweru)
1995 : Dynamos (Harare)
1996 : CAPS United (Harare)
1997 : CAPS United (Harare)
1998 : Highlanders (Bulawayo)
1999 : Amazulu (Bulawayo)
2000 : No cup held
2001 : Highlanders (Bulawayo)
2002 : Highlanders (Bulawayo)
2003 : Black Rhinos (Harare)
2004 : Dynamos (Harare)
2005 : Motor Action
2006 : Masvingo United (Masvingo)
2007 : Masvingo United (Masvingo)
2008 : Shooting Stars
2009 : Njube Sundowns (Gwanda)
2010 : Dynamos (Harare)
2011 : Highlanders (Bulawayo)
2012 : Platinum (Zvishavane)
2013 : Dynamos (Harare)
2014 : Platinum (Zvishavane)
2015 : Platinum (Zvishavane)
2016 : Chicken Inn FC'' (Bulawayo)
2017 : Dynamos (Harare)
2019 : Highlanders''' (Bulawayo)

References

Independence
National association football cups
Recurring sporting events established in 1983